"Inhibitions" is a eurodance song performed by Swedish band Alcazar. The song is the second single from their third album, Disco Defenders.

Track list
Digital download
 Inhibitions (album version) - 3:06

Chart performance
The song made its debut on Swedish Singles Charts at number 50 on 26 June 2008 and then dropped out from the charts. The song made its re-enter on Swedish Singles Charts  at number 10 on 18 September 2008, giving Alcazar their seventh Top 10 hit chart and the second Top 10 hit chart from the album. "Inhibitions" stayed on Swedish Singles Charts for four weeks.

References

External links
Alcazar Official Website
Lyrics of this song - Inhibitions

Alcazar (band) songs
Eurodance songs
2008 singles
Songs written by Nicky Chinn
2008 songs
Songs written by Anders Hansson (songwriter)
Universal Records singles